Culture Wars: The Struggle to Define America is a book written by James Davison Hunter and published in 1991. It concerns the idea of a struggle to define American public life between two cultures: the progressives and the orthodox. The book illustrates its framework of historical analysis through several of the contemporary issues of the time: abortion rights, school prayer, gay rights, and more.

Progressive and orthodox views are primarily systems of moral understanding. He identifies orthodoxy as a viewpoint through which moral truth is static, universal, and sanctioned through divine powers; contrasting progressivism, which sees moral truth as evolving and contextual. These two groups are locked in an everlasting "culture war" to assert dominion over the various institutional and systemic entities influenced by contemporary cultural praxis, most visibly the governing branches of America.

References

Sources

1991 non-fiction books
American culture
American non-fiction books
Society of the United States
Sociology books